Andreas Dahl (born 6 June 1984) is a Swedish former football player. He has previously spent one season at Coventry City F.C. Prior to that, he represented his home town club IFK Hässleholm. Dahl has made 15 matches for the Swedish under-21 national team.

It was announced August 2007 that Dahl has signed for FC Nordsjælland from Helsingborgs IF, a contract starting on 1 January 2008.

On 12 April in the match between Aab and Nordsjalland, a streaker invaded the pitch and Dahl took it upon himself to stop him. The Danish Premier League player says he has no regrets about kicking a streaker where it hurts, 'I know it's the stewards' job, but why shouldn't I be allowed to kick him in the balls? I just stuck out a leg and hit him straight in his special area. I guess it was a bit unfortunate for him, but it wasn't as if I was aiming. He sure went down fast.' This incident prompted comments by the Danish Press of the form 'Dahl is a player that keeps his eye on the balls".

On 26 June 2009 it was announced that he had signed a contract for 3.5 year with Hammarby IF, thus making his return in Allsvenskan.

References

External links

1984 births
Living people
Swedish footballers
Sweden international footballers
Sweden under-21 international footballers
Sweden youth international footballers
Coventry City F.C. players
Hammarby Fotboll players
Helsingborgs IF players
FC Nordsjælland players
Landskrona BoIS players
IFK Hässleholm players
Allsvenskan players
Danish Superliga players
Swedish expatriate footballers
Expatriate footballers in England
Expatriate men's footballers in Denmark
Swedish expatriate sportspeople in Denmark
Swedish expatriate sportspeople in the United Kingdom
Association football midfielders